Kevin Finney (born 19 October 1969) is an English former footballer who played as a midfielder for Port Vale, Lincoln City, Leek Town, and Stafford Rangers.

Career
Finney came up through the Port Vale youth team to sign as a professional in May 1987. He featured 22 times in the 1987–88 campaign, and scored the only goal of the game against Macclesfield Town to book the "Valiants" an FA Cup tie with First Division giants Tottenham Hotspur. This goal was reported to have kept manager John Rudge in his job, who went on to become the club's most successful ever manager. However, Rudge used Finney mainly as a substitute in 17 games in the 1988–89 season. He scored his first league goal on the last day of the Third Division season: a 2–1 win over Fulham at Craven Cottage on 13 May. He appeared as a substitute for Andy Porter in the 1–0 win over Bristol Rovers at Vale Park on 3 June, in the second leg of the play-off final. However his first team opportunities became more limited in the Second Division, and he featured just nine times in the 1989–90 season. He appeared just once, in the League Cup, in the 1990–91 campaign, and was handed a free transfer to Steve Thompson's Lincoln City in May 1991. The "Imps" posted a tenth-place finish in the Fourth Division in 1991–92, before finishing outside the play-offs on goal difference in 1992–93. He scored two goals in 37 league appearances during his two seasons at Sincil Bank. Finney then moved into non-league football, and featured in the Northern Premier League with Leek Town and in the Conference with Stafford Rangers.

Career statistics
Source:

Honours
Port Vale
Football League Third Division play-offs: 1989

References

1969 births
Living people
Sportspeople from Newcastle-under-Lyme
English footballers
Association football midfielders
Port Vale F.C. players
Lincoln City F.C. players
Leek Town F.C. players
Stafford Rangers F.C. players
English Football League players
Northern Premier League players
National League (English football) players